Jürgen Reinhard Gerhard Herzog (born 21 December 1941 in Heidelberg, Germany) is an Emeritus Professor of Mathematics at University of Duisburg-Essen, in Essen, Germany. From 1969 to 1975, he was Lecturer at University of Regensburg and from 1975 to 2009 a professor of Mathematics at University of Duisburg-Essen.

Life
Herzog was born in Heidelberg and raised in Eberbach. After military service in the German Army, he enrolled at the University of Kiel from 1963 and began studying mathematics and physics. Herzog transferred to the University of Heidelberg in 1964, and completed his undergraduate studies there. He completed his habilitation at the University of Regensburg in 1974. He is an expert in the field of commutative algebra and its interactions to other mathematical fields such as combinatorics.

Selected publications 
 Bruns, Winfred, Herzog, Jürgen, (1993).  Cohen-Macaulay rings, Cambridge studies in advanced mathematics 39, Cambridge University Press.
 Herzog, Jürgen, Hibi, Takayuki, (2011).  Monomial Ideals, Graduate Text in Mathematics.
 Ene, Viviana, Herzog, Jürgen] (2012). Gröbner Bases in Commutative Algebra, Graduate Studies in Mathematics, 130. American Mathematical Society, Providence, RI.
 Herzog, Jürgen, Hibi, Takayuki, Ohsugi, Hidefumi, (2018).  Binomial Ideals, Springer Graduate Texts in Mathematics.

References

20th-century German mathematicians
1941 births
Living people
Scientists from Heidelberg
Louisiana State University alumni
Purdue University alumni
University of Regensburg alumni
Academic staff of the University of Duisburg-Essen
Academic staff of the University of Regensburg
Heidelberg University alumni
People from Eberbach (Baden)
University of Kiel alumni